The Conversation is a reality television series that premiered on March 15, 2020 on Zeus Network.

Series synopsis
The Conversation captures raw, real and explosive confrontations from notable personalities in the world of business, fame and celebrity, using unfiltered footage, without the intervention of mediators.

Development
The first teaser was released on March 1, 2020 and features Love & Hip Hop: Hollywood stars Ray J and Princess Love. A trailer for the fourth and fifth episodes was released on June 28, 2020 and features Love & Hip Hop: Hollywood stars A1 Bentley and Lyrica Anderson as well as their mothers Pam Bentley and Lyrica Garrett. Filming of the sixth and seventh episodes occurred on August 30, 2020 when former Love & Hip Hop: Hollywood star Hazel E took to Instagram live following an altercation with co-star Masika Kalysha. On November 8, 2020, a teaser for the eighth and ninth episodes was released and featured former Bad Girls Club cast members: Jada Cacchilli, Natalie Nunn, Sarah Oliver, Christina Rome, Rocky Santiago and Shannon Sarich.

Episodes

Season 1 (2020–2021)

References

External links
Official Show Website

2020s American reality television series
2020 American television series debuts
English-language television shows